Heap is a surname. Notable people with the surname include:

 Bob Heap, English footballer
 Brian Heap, British biologist
 Dan Heap, Canadian politician
 David Porter Heap, American engineer
 Fred Heap, English footballer
 Imogen Heap, British singer-songwriter 
 Jessica Heap, American actress
 John Heap, British geographer
 Mark Heap, British actor
 Todd Heap (born 1980), American football player
 Tom Heap, British television and radio reporter and presenter

See also 

 Heap (disambiguation)
 Heaps (surname)
 Septimus Heap
 Walter Heape (1855–1929), English zoologist and embryologist
 Heep